Television channels in the Republic of China, commonly known as Taiwan.

Digital television 
Digital television launched terrestrially throughout Taiwan on 1 July 2004, using the DVB-T system. After years of simulcasting, Taiwan replaced analogue broadcasting with a digital system by 2014. The Republic of China Cabinet approved a measure mandating that all new televisions are to be equipped with a digital television tuner from 2006. The rule applied to TVs measuring between 21 and 29 inches in 2007, and to sets of all sizes in 2008. To assist lower-income families with the switch to digital television, the government provided NT$300 million in aid to purchase converters or for the purchase of new digital televisions.  In February 2009, the National Communications Commission proposed amendments to the Cable Television Act; they include mandating cable companies to provide free set-top boxes.

HDTV 
High-definition television broadcast was introduced to Taiwanese audiences with the trial run of HiHD, provided by Public Television Service.

Cable television 
Cable television is prevalent in Taiwan, as a result of cheap subscription rates (typically around NT$550, or US$15 a month) and the paucity of free-to-air television, which comprises four channels.  Programming is mostly in Mandarin and Taiwanese, with some English, Japanese and other foreign-language channels.  Miniseries, called Taiwanese drama, are popular and are being exported to markets mainly in East and Southeast Asia, and Latin America, with some dramas available on OTT platforms such as Netflix, YouTube, or Viki. There is a dedicated station for Taiwan's Hakka minority as well as the arrival in 2005 of an aboriginal channel.  Almost all programs are in the original language with traditional Chinese subtitles.

List of channels

Free-to-air
In Taiwan, there are six nationwide free-to-air television bouquets, as follows:

Analog television 
Taiwan terminated over-the-air analog broadcasting on 30 June 2012, and the remainder of the analog system ended in 2014, when the analog cable television broadcasts were terminated.

The first three free-to-air analogue terrestrial television stations, using the American NTSC system, were launched during the 1960s and 1970s:
 10 October 1962 at 19:00 TST: first free-to-air terrestrial television station Taiwan Television (TTV) on Channel 21 UHF was officially launched and initially broadcasting hours were from 19:00 until 23:00 TST a total of four hours daily based in Taipei.
 31 October 1969 at 19:00 TST: second free-to-air terrestrial television station China Television (CTV) on Channel 22 UHF was officially launched and initially broadcasting hours were from 19:00 until 23:00 TST a total of four hours daily based in Taipei. 
 31 October 1971 at 19:00 TST: third free-to-air terrestrial television station Chinese Television System (CTS) on Channel 23 UHF was officially launched and initially broadcasting hours were from 19:00 until 23:00 TST a total of four hours daily based in Taipei.
In the late 1990s, two new free-to-air television channels were officially launched:
 Formosa Television (FTV), on 11 June 1997 at 18:00 TST on VHF Channel 5 (82.250-MHz).
 Public Television Service (PTS), on 1 July 1998 at 19:00 TST on UHF Channel 53 (704.250-MHz).

Most viewed channels

See also 
 Media in Taiwan
 List of Taiwanese television series
 List of Taiwanese dramas
 Censorship in Taiwan
 Press Freedom Index

References 

 
1962 establishments in Taiwan